The Niels Brock House is a historic property located at Strandgade 36 in the Christianshavn neighbourhood of Copenhagen, Denmark. The property comprises the former warehouse at Wildersgade 51 on the other side of the block as well as a number of side wings in the yard. The building takes its name after the businessman Niels Brock for whom it was adapted in the 1780s. Other notable former residents include the historian r Peder Vilhelm Jacobsen (1799-1848) and the businessman Christian August Broberg. The entire complex was listed in the Danish registry of protected buildings and places in 1918.

History

Early history

The property was listed as No. 25 in Christianshavn Quarter in Copenhagen's first cadastre of 1689. It was at that time owned by magister Peder Møller. The property was listed as No. 42 in the new cadastre of 1756 and was then owned by one etatsråd Lund.

Niels Brock

The house was built for Niels Brock in 1780.

Brock's household consisted of nine people in 1787. He resided in the building with his housekeeper M.C.Adolph, his bookkeeper Jens Perch, two clerks, a female cook, a maid, a coachman and a caretaker. The property was again home to nine residents at the 1801 census.

The house was after Brock's death administrated by Grosserer-Societetet and the proceeds were used for grants for Efterslægtens Skole.

19th century
The property was listed as No. 40 in the new cadastre of 1806. It was at that time owned by  Niels Brock Sommerfeldt (1772-1821). His father Hans Nicolai Sommerfeldt was a teacher at Randers Latin School and Noels Brock was his godfather. His sister Helene was married to another "Niels Brock", namely Niels Brock Hansen, who owned Strandgade 24. One of their brothers was mommodore Søren Siemsen Sommerfeldt )1661-1827), whose grandson Wilhelm Ferdinand Sommerfeldt would more than half a century later establish the wine retailer Kjær & Sommerfeldt a few houses down the street at Strandgade 27.

 
The merchant and politician Christian August Broberg (1811-1886) resided in the building from 1837 to 1880. The nearby street Brobergsgade is named after him. The historian and writer Peder Vilhelm Jacobsen (1799-1848) lived in the building from 1846 to 1848.

Broberg occupied the entire building at the 1860 census. He lived there with his wife, their four children, two housejeepers (huskomfruer), a female cook, a maid, a male serant and a caretaker.

 
The property was owned by master mason A. Aagaard at the 1880 census. It was home to 27 residents. Carl August Broberg (1846-1917), a businessman (grosserer) and consul, resided on the first floor with his wife Camilla Broberg, their three children (aged five to eight), his two unmarried sisters Anna and Marie (aged 36 and 43), a nanny, a nurse, two female cooks, one male servant and one maid.

The next owner of the property was Styhr &Kjær, a trading house founded on 2 August 1866 byRasmus Selgen Sthyr and  Peter Bernhard Kjær,.Sthyr & Kjær sold the property to J. J. Carøe, a leading importer of tea and spices led by Henri Odewahn and K. Gram. They undertook a comprehensive restoration of the building with the assistance of the architect Bent Helweg-Møller.

Architecture
The house was renovated by the architect Bent Helweg-Møller in 1917-1918. The complex also comprises the warehouse at Wildersgade 51 on the other side of the block and a side wing along the north side of the courtyard that separates the two buildings.

Gallery

References

External links

 Niels Brocks Gård at indenforvoldene.dk

Houses in Copenhagen
Listed residential buildings in Copenhagen
Listed buildings and structures in Christianshavn
Houses completed in 1780
1780 establishments in Denmark